Li Zhaoyi may refer to:

Some of Consort Li who received the "zhaoyi" title:
Li Shunxian ( 900–926), Iranian-born concubine of Former Shu's final emperor Wang Yan
Li Zhaoyi (d. 264), Chinese concubine of the Shu Han emperor, Liu Shan
Consort Yi (Ming dynasty) (1392–1421), known in Chinese as Consort Li, Korean-born concubine of the Yongle Emperor
Li Zhaoyi (taekwondo) (born 1994)

See also
Li Chaoyi (1934–2018), Chinese neurobiologist